Justice Cady may refer to:

Daniel Cady (1773–1859), ex officio judge of the New York Court of Appeals
Mark Cady (1953–2019), chief justice of the Iowa Supreme Court